Hundreds of Empire ships were employed by the Government of the United Kingdom. They were acquired from a number of sources: many were built for the government; others obtained from the United States; still others were captured or seized from enemy powers. Empire ships were mostly used during World War II by the Ministry of War Transport (MoWT), which owned the ships but contracted out their management to various shipping lines; however, some ships requisitioned during the Suez Crisis were also named as Empire ships. Most Empire ships have since been lost or scrapped; however, a few still remain in active service or preserved.

Lists 
The list of Empire ships is split into a number of smaller lists.

List of Empire ships (A)
List of Empire ships (B)
List of Empire ships (Ca–Cl)
List of Empire ships (Co–Cy)
List of Empire ships (D)
List of Empire ships (E)
List of Empire ships (F)
List of Empire ships (G)
List of Empire ships (H)
List of Empire ships (I–J)
List of Empire ships (K)
List of Empire ships (L)
List of Empire ships (M)
List of Empire ships (N)
List of Empire ships (O)
List of Empire ships (P)
List of Empire ships (R)
List of Empire ships (Sa–Sh)
List of Empire ships (Si–Sy)
List of Empire ships (Ta–Te)
List of Empire ships (Th–Ty)
List of Empire ships (U–Z)

List of Empire ships built in the United States (122)

References